Tarachodes arabicus is a species of praying mantis in the family Eremiaphilidae.

See also
List of mantis genera and species

References

Tarachodes
Arthropods of the Middle East
Insects described in 1922